The California Dried Plum Festival, formerly the California Prune Festival was an annual festival held in Yuba City, California between 1988 and 2002.

Its September 2002 edition included a freestyle disc tournament organized by the Freestyle Players Association.

The name change in 2001 from California Prune Festival to California Dried Plum Festival provoked some amused comments from onlookers.

Parade
Every year, on the Friday before the two-day weekend festival began, the Prune Parade would take place in the downtown district of Yuba City on Plumas Street.  Community groups, businesses, and local schools would participate in creating floats for the parade.

References

Sutter Foods – History of the Prune Industry Discusses growing regions, harvesting techniques and marketing issues such as the California Prune Festival

Festivals in California
Food and drink festivals in the United States
Agricultural shows in the United States
Agriculture in California
Recurring events established in 1988
Recurring events disestablished in 2002
Fruit festivals